The Czech Republic men's national softball team is the men's national softball team of the Czech Republic.  The team competed at the 1996 ISF Men's World Championship in Midland, Michigan where they finished with 5 wins and 5 losses.  The team competed at the 2000 ISF Men's World Championship in East London, South Africa where they finished sixth. The team competed at the 2004 ISF Men's World Championship in Christchurch, New Zealand where they finished seventh.  The team competed at the 2009 ISF Men's World Championship in Saskatoon, Saskatchewan where they finished ninth.

References

Softball
Men's national softball teams
Men's sport in the Czech Republic
Softball in the Czech Republic